The Shantou–Shanwei high-speed railway is a high-speed railway currently under construction in China. The railway runs from Shantou railway station to Shanwei railway station. It serves as a faster parallel corridor to the existing mixed passenger freight Xiamen–Shenzhen railway. The line has a total length of 162 kilometers with 7 stations.

History
A feasibility study on the line was approved in September 2018. On October 17, the Environmental Protection Department of Guangdong Province approved the "Report on Environmental Impact of the Shantou-Shanwei Railway". On December 26, 2018 the groundbreaking ceremony of the railway line was held in Jieyang. Construction on the undersea tunnel crossing the Shantou Bay (汕头湾) started in March 2020.

Stations

References

High-speed railway lines in China
High-speed railway lines under construction